Tischeria deliquescens is a moth of the  family Tischeriidae. It is known from Guyana.

References

Tischeriidae
Moths described in 1915